The 1973–74 Bradford City A.F.C. season was the 61st in the club's history.

The club finished 8th in Division Four, reached the 4th round of the FA Cup, and the 1st round of the League Cup.

Sources

References

1973-74
Bradford City